Clapham High School is a public, English-speaking high school in Queenswood, Pretoria, in the Gauteng province of South Africa. The school moved out of central Pretoria to the present facilities in Queenswood, beginning of 1955, and has approximately 1300 pupils.

Sport

The school intra-sport teams are divided into houses which are named after the members of the Terra Nova Expedition: Scott, Wilson, Evans, Bowers, and Oates.

Sport is not compulsory, as the school believes that success and enjoyment comes with voluntary participation. However, the grade 8 learners are expected to attend most of the sport meetings as spectators. The school offers the following sports:

 Athletics
 Basketball
 Cricket
 Cross Country
 Field Hockey
 Netball
 Squash (sport)
 Soccer
 Swimming
 Tennis

Clapham High School is part of the Pretoria English Medium High Schools Athletics Association which is good-spirited rivalry between all the co-ed government schools in Pretoria. The schools have three meetings held a year including the swimming gala (held at Hillcrest Swimming Pool), cross country (held at the host school) and an athletics meeting (held at Pilditch Stadium). Other schools participating in the association are: 
 Hillview High School
 Lyttelton Manor High School
 Pretoria Technical High School
 Pretoria Secondary School
 Rietondale High School
 Sutherland High School, Centurion
 The Glen High School
 Willowridge High School

References 
 Clapham High School official website Retrieved 10 July 2017.

High schools in South Africa
Schools in Pretoria
Educational institutions established in 1948
1948 establishments in South Africa